The Hungary national futsal team represents Hungary in international futsal competitions such as the FIFA Futsal World Cup and the European Championships and is controlled by the Hungarian Football Federation.

Tournament records

FIFA Futsal World Cup

UEFA European Futsal Championship

Grand Prix de Futsal

Futsal Mundialito

Players

Current squad
Head coach: Sito Rivera

Results and fixtures

2015

2016

References

External links
Official website

Hungary
Futsal
Futsal in Hungary